The canton of Campagne-lès-Hesdin  is a former canton situated in the Pas-de-Calais département and in the Nord-Pas-de-Calais region of France. It was disbanded following the French canton reorganisation which came into effect in March 2015. It consisted of 23 communes, which joined the canton of Auxi-le-Château in 2015. It had a total of 11,007 inhabitants (2012).

Geography 
An area of small valleys and plateaux, consisting mostly of farmland, with the town of Campagne-lès-Hesdin in the arrondissement of Montreuil at its centre. 
The altitude varies from 2m (Roussent) to 132m (Boubers-lès-Hesmond).with an average altitude of 44m.

The canton comprised 23 communes:

Aix-en-Issart
Beaurainville
Boisjean
Boubers-lès-Hesmond
Brimeux
Buire-le-Sec
Campagne-lès-Hesdin
Douriez
Gouy-Saint-André
Hesmond
Lespinoy
Loison-sur-Créquoise
Maintenay
Marant
Marenla
Maresquel-Ecquemicourt
Marles-sur-Canche
Offin
Roussent
Saint-Denœux
Saint-Rémy-au-Bois
Saulchoy
Sempy

Population

See also 
 Pas-de-Calais
 Cantons of Pas-de-Calais
 Communes of Pas-de-Calais

References

Former cantons of Pas-de-Calais
2015 disestablishments in France
States and territories disestablished in 2015